Arseny Alexandrovich Sokolov (19 March 1910 – 19 October 1986) was a Russian theoretical physicist known for the development of synchrotron radiation theory.

Biography
Arseny Sokolov graduated from Tomsk State University (TSU) in 1931. He obtained the degree of Kandidat nauk (Candidat of Science, equivalent to PhD) from TSU under supervision of Piotr Tartakovsky (1934). The degree of Doktor nauk (Doctor of Science) was obtained by him from Leningrad Ioffe Physico-Technical Institute (1942, at that time in evacuation in Kazan).

Then he moved to Moscow State University (MSU), where he held the positions of the dean of the Faculty of Physics (1948–1954) and the head of the Theoretical Physics Department at the Faculty of Physics (1966–1982).  He was a member of the Soviet Communist Party, a dean and secretary of bureau of the Communist Party of the Physics Department of the Moscow State University.

Research
Sokolov's research areas were quantum field theory and elementary particle physics.
 Together with Dmitri Ivanenko he worked on the development of synchrotron radiation theory. His collaboration with Dmitry Ivanenko continued for almost 50 years.
 Together with Igor Ternov he discovered new quantum effects in microscopic particle motion such as Quantum Fluctuations of Electron Trajectories in Accelerators and the Effect of Radiative Polarization of Electrons and Positrons in a Magnetic Field known as the Sokolov–Ternov effect.

Selected publications

Books
A. A. Sokolov, I. M. Ternov, Synchrotron Radiation, Elsevier, 1969. .
A. A. Sokolov, I. M. Ternov, Synchrotron Radiation from Relativistic Electrons (edited by C. W. Kilmister), American Inst. of Physics, New York, 1986. .
A. A. Sokolov, I. M. Ternov, and V. Ch. Zhukovskii, Quantum Mechanics, Imported Pubn., 1986. .
A. A. Sokolov, I. M. Ternov, and V. Ch. Zhukovskii, A. V. Borisov, Quantum Electrodynamics, Mir Publishing Moscow, 1988

Papers

Doctoral students
Igor Ternov
Luis de la Peña

Awards
Stalin Prize
USSR State Prize (1976) — for prediction and development of the effect of radiative polarization of electrons and positrons in a magnetic field (with Igor Ternov).
2 Orders of the Badge of Honour
Medal "For Labour Valour"

Soviet physicists
Academic staff of Moscow State University
Tomsk State University alumni
People from Novosibirsk
1910 births
1986 deaths
Theoretical physicists
Accelerator physicists
Academic staff of Tomsk State Pedagogical University